The Sotoyomo-class tugboats were a class of United States Navy rescue tugboats. Designed as "rescue tugs", the class consisted of forty-nine ships, classified as auxiliaries. Sotoyomo commemorates a part of the Sioux tribe.

Ships

United States

United Kingdom

See also
 Type V ship - Tugs

References

Auxiliary tugboat classes